Long Điền may refer to several places in Vietnam:

Long Điền District, a rural district of Bà Rịa-Vũng Tàu Province
Long Điền (township), a township and capital of Long Điền District
Long Điền, Bạc Liêu, a commune of Đông Hải District

See also
Long Điền A, a commune in Chợ Mới District, An Giang Province
Long Điền B, a commune in Chợ Mới District, An Giang Province
Long Điền Đông, a commune in Đông Hải District, Bạc Liêu Province
Long Điền Đông A, a commune in Đông Hải District, Bạc Liêu Province
Long Điền Tây, a commune in Đông Hải District, Bạc Liêu Province